Gregg Hill (born September 26, 1977) is an American former professional tennis player.

A native of North Carolina, Hill was trained in Florida and made the junior doubles semi-finals at Wimbledon. He played collegiate tennis for the University of Southern California.

Hill began competing on tour in the 1990s and made two doubles main draw appearances on the ATP Tour partnered with longtime friend Tommy Haas, including Delray Beach in 2009.

References

External links
 
 

1977 births
Living people
American male tennis players
USC Trojans men's tennis players
Tennis people from North Carolina